Alastair Iain Macdonald Haggart (10 October 1915 – 11 January 1998) was an eminent Anglican priest.

Biography
Haggart was born on 10 October 1915 and brought up in Fort William. He was raised in the Free Church of Scotland but became an Episcopalian in his early 20s. At age 23 he made the decision to train for ministry and studied at Edinburgh Theological College. From there he won an open exhibition to Hatfield College, Durham and graduated with a BA in 1941, and proceeded to an MA four years later. He married Peggy Trundle, a typist, and had two daughters.

Career
Haggart was ordained in 1941. He began his career with curacies at St Mary's Cathedral, Glasgow and St Mary's Hendon. He was precentor at St Ninian's Cathedral, Perth from 1948 to 1951. After this he was rector of St Oswald's, King's Park, Glasgow and then acting priest-in-charge of St Martin's, Glasgow. In 1959 he became provost of St Paul's Cathedral, Dundee, a post he held until 1969 when he became principal and pantonian professor of his old theological college.

He became Bishop of Edinburgh in 1975; and Primus of the Episcopal Church in Scotland in 1977. He retired from both posts in 1985 and died on 11 January 1998.

References

1915 births
Alumni of Hatfield College, Durham
Provosts of St Paul's Cathedral, Dundee
20th-century Scottish Episcopalian bishops
Bishops of Edinburgh
Primuses of the Scottish Episcopal Church
20th-century Anglican archbishops
1998 deaths
Seminary presidents
Alumni of Edinburgh Theological College